Willem de Fesch (1687, Alkmaar – 3 January 1761) was a virtuoso Dutch violone player and composer.

The pupil of Karel Rosier, who was a Vice-Kapellmeister at Bonn, de Fesch later married his daughter, Maria Anna Rosier.

De Fesch was active in Amsterdam between 1710 and 1725. From 1725 to 1731 he served as Kapellmeister at Antwerp Cathedral.

Thereafter he moved to London where he gave concerts and played the violone in Handel's orchestra in 1746. In 1748 and 1749 he conducted at Marylebone Gardens. He apparently made no public appearances after 1750.

His works included the oratorios Judith (1732) and Joseph (1746), as well as chamber duets, solo and trio sonatas, concertos and part songs. Both oratorios were thought lost until 1980 when a copy of a manuscript of Joseph was found in London's Royal Academy of Music.

De Fesch's music was influenced by the Italians, particularly Vivaldi, as well as Handel.

Works
Op. 1: 6 Sonate per 2 Violini e 6 Sonate per due Cioloncelli  (Roger/Amsterdam 1715)
Op. 2: Molti Concerti e Concerti grossi (Roger/Amsterdam 1717) 
Op. 3: Molti Concerti e Concerti grossi (Roger/Amsterdam 1718) 
Op. 4: 6 Sonate per Violino e Basso continuo (B. c.), 6 Sonate per 2 violoncelli (1725)
Op. 5: Concerti e Concerti grossi (Le Cène/Amsterdam 1725)
Op. 6: Sonate per Strumento solo con B. c. (1730)
Op. 7: 10 Sonate a tre (a 2 Flauti o Violini e Basso continuo) (1733)
Op. 8: Sonate (1736)
Op. 9: Sonate per 2 Violini o Flauti (Walsh/London 1739)
Op. 10: Molti Concerti e Concerti grossi (Walsh/London 1741)
Op. 11: Duo per 2 Violoni o Flauti (1743)
Op. 12: Sonate per 2 Violoni o Flauti (1748)
Op. 13: Sonate per Violoncello e B. c. (1750)
Carillon ( 1725–26)
Missa paschalis (1730)
Oratorios Judith (1733), Joseph (1745)

References

External links

 Biography at allclassical.com 
 Joseph Brilliant Classics 96107 (February 2021)
 

1687 births
1761 deaths
18th-century classical composers
18th-century male musicians
18th-century musicians
Composers for carillon
Dutch male classical composers
Dutch classical composers
Dutch Baroque composers
People from Alkmaar